was a Japanese
entomologist.

In 1908, at the age of 16, Jinhaku Sonan arrived in Taiwan where he completed his education in Creek Middle Schools evening division 1909 where he later taught. In 1909, the Taiwan Governor Museum was established  to display zoological and insect specimens and he became an insect collector for the Central Purchasing Agency which administered the museums finance. From 1912 to 1916 he served in the Imperial Japanese Navy but returned to Taiwan. In 1947 after the Second World War he returned to Japan, working in agriculture, forestry, agriculture, the tea industry and the Japan Association of plant quarantine. In old age he settled in Tokyo, (1984). Jinhaku Sonan died at the age of 92 years.

His entomological research in Taiwan, concerned Lepidoptera, Ichneumonidae, and insect pests of tea and more generally, was the pioneer student of Taiwan's insect fauna.

Works

Partial list from over 100
Sonan, J. (1930) Some butterflies from Hainan Island. Transactions of the Natural History Society of Formosa, 20, 31–37. [In Japanese]
Sonan, J. (1930) Notes on some butterflies from Formosa. Zephyrus, 2, 165–176, 1 pl. [In Japanese]
Sonan, J. (1936) Notes on some butterflies from Formosa. Zephyrus, 6, 205–216, 3 pls. [In Japanese]
Sonan, J. (1938) A list of the butterflies of Hainan, with descriptions of two new sub-species of Hesperiidae.Transactions of the Natural History Society of Formosa, 28, 348–372, 2f. [In Japanese]
Sonan, J. (1938) Notes on some butterflies from Formosa (5). Zephyrus, 7, 250–275, 1 pl. [In Japanese]
Sonan, J. & Mitono, T. (1936) On a new species of Hesperiidae, Coladenia sadakoe Sonan et Mitono. Zephyrus, 6,184–185. [In Japanese]
Sonan, J. 1936. Six new species of Pimplinae (Hym. Ichneumonidae). Transactions of the Natural History Society of Formosa. Taihoku, 26(158): 413–119.

Japanese entomologists
1892 births
1984 deaths
Japanese lepidopterists
20th-century Japanese zoologists